Under One Person with subtitle The Outcast is a Chinese webcomic by Dong Man Tang, illustrated by Mi Er, and published by Tencent. It was first published under the title 异人 (Yi Ren, literally: "Weirdo") and with subtitle King of the Weirdo in February 2015.

A collaboration Chinese/Japanese anime television series adaptation titled  aired from July 9 to September 24, 2016. A second season aired from January 16 to June 26, 2018, and simulcast in Chinese and Japanese.

Plot
Chou Soran was a normal college student until he gets caught up in a terrible incident in a small village while visiting his grandfather's grave. While walking through the graveyard to pay visit to his deceased grandfather, Soran is assaulted by zombies until a mysterious girl wielding a knife appears and leads him to a confrontation with the zombies. After successfully fending off the zombies and further encounters with the knife wielding girl known as Fu Hōhō, Soran's life begins to change as he learns that the martial arts technique taught to him by his grandfather, known as Kitaigen, is a technique being sought after by many martial arts groups with ulterior motives. The story follows Soran's attempt to find out his grandfather's real history and his supposed connection with Fu Hōhō.

Characters

A college student and the inheritor of Kitaigen – a powerful martial arts technique that utilizes Qi. After finding out that his grandfather is much more than what he is led to believe, he begins to unravel his grandfather's true history with  Fū Hōhō as his only lead. Unbeknownst to him, he is also an Outsider that has acquired his status after being trained by his grandfather.

A young looking girl with a mysterious past who works for Express Delivery Company and is also an Outsider. She is an adept fighter although without any formal martial arts training. She wields a knife that she usually hides and only uses it in case of serious situations. It is hinted that Fū Hōhō is connected to Soran's grandfather and may be the key in unraveling the mysteries surrounding her past and Soran's grandfather and that she might've been alive for more than a century while still retaining her youthful appearance.

A high-ranking employee of 'Express Delivery Company' – a front company sponsored by the fictional Chinese state government that employs 'Outsiders' to harbor them and prevent Outsiders from causing disruptions in society. 'Outsiders' are people with the ability to control and manifest their Qi to perform superhuman and psychic feats achieved through rigorous martial arts training or being inherently born with the ability to control their Qi. Jo San is also an Outsider with the psychic ability to control objects.

Jo San's brother and another employee of Express Delivery Company with more or less equal status to Jo San.

An employee of Express Delivery Company. He is an Outsider that uses his Qi to burrow underground and use tunnels to move quickly from one place to another.

A girl who attempted to kidnap Chō Soran to prove worthy of joining Zensei – a mysterious organization of Outsiders with nefarious motives and considered to be a formidable force in the world of Outsiders. She is also an Outsider with the ability to control deceased humans and turn them into zombies that she can control.

Chō Soran's grandfather that has mysterious connections to Zensei, Fū Hōhō, and Tenshifu – an ancient martial arts organization that harbors outsiders and the most influential organization in the world of Outsiders. He is the progenitor of the Kitaigen technique – a technique that involves utilizing Qi to perform superhuman feats.

Anime
An anime adaptation, titled , was produced by Emon, directed by Wang Xin with assistant directors Kazuhiro Toda and Mitsuo Mori, and animated by Pandanium (season 1) and Haoliners themselves (season 2). Tokyo MX broadcast a special "episode 0" on July 2 and the first episode aired on July 9. An English-subtitled version premiered on Crunchyroll on July 9. The opening theme is "ARCADIA" by Lilith while the ending theme is "In the Dawn" by Affective Synergy. Crunchyroll streamed the second season.

Episode list

Season 1

Season 2

References

External links
  
 
 
  
 

2016 anime television series debuts
Chinese comedy webcomics
Chinese web series
Comedy web series
Manhua titles
2015 comics debuts
2010s webcomics
Fantasy webcomics
Television shows based on webcomics
Television shows based on manhua
Tokyo MX original programming
Haoliners Animation League
Tencent manhua
Animated series based on comics
2016 Chinese television series debuts
2016 Chinese television series endings
2016 Japanese television series endings
Manhua adapted into television series
Chinese animated television series
Crunchyroll anime
Zombie web series
Animated web series